Bryan David Hickerson (born October 13, 1963) is a former Major League Baseball pitcher who played for the San Francisco Giants, Chicago Cubs, and Colorado Rockies from 1991 to 1995.

Biography
A native of Bemidji, Minnesota, Hickerson graduated from Bemidji High School and the University of Minnesota. In 1985, he played collegiate summer baseball with the Cotuit Kettleers of the Cape Cod Baseball League.

Hickerson was selected by the Minnesota Twins in the 7th round of the 1986 MLB Draft, and was traded to the San Francisco Giants in 1987. He made his major league debut with San Francisco in 1991, and appeared in 202 games over a five year major league career.

Hickerson is currently on staff with U.P.I., a baseball ministry in Winona Lake, Indiana, where he lives with his wife Jo and children, and is director of Intercession Haiti.

References

External links

Major League Baseball pitchers
Baseball players from Minnesota
San Francisco Giants players
Chicago Cubs players
Colorado Rockies players
1963 births
Living people
Minnesota Golden Gophers baseball players
Cotuit Kettleers players
Visalia Oaks players
Shreveport Captains players
Clinton Giants players
San Jose Giants players
Phoenix Firebirds players
Minor league baseball coaches